Tullnerbach-Pressbaum is a railway station serving Tullnerbach in Lower Austria.

References 

Railway stations in Lower Austria
Austrian Federal Railways